James Oswald (3 January 1868 – 26 February 1948) was a Scottish footballer who played as a centre forward. He took part in the 1891 FA Cup Final for Notts County (scoring their goal in a 3–1 defeat to Blackburn Rovers). During his career he also played in Scotland for Third Lanark and St Bernard's, winning the Scottish Cup with both clubs either side of his spell in England, in 1889 and 1895. He also spent four years with Rangers (1895 to 1899), during which time they claimed two Scottish Cups and a Scottish Football League title, but Oswald was a reserve and his involvement in these wins was minimal. He then finished his career at Morton.

Oswald made three appearances for Scotland (scoring once) between 1894 and 1896. He also represented the Scottish Football League XI three times.

His younger brother John Oswald was also a footballer; both siblings (who were born in Greenock but relocated to the Gorbals area of Glasgow with their family when very young), played together in the 1889 Scottish Cup Final, then moved to England to play for Notts County.

See also
List of Scotland national football team captains
List of Scottish football families

References

External links

1868 births
1948 deaths
Footballers from Greenock
People from Gorbals
Footballers from Glasgow
Scottish footballers
Scotland international footballers
English Football League players
Notts County F.C. players
Rangers F.C. players
Greenock Morton F.C. players
Third Lanark A.C. players
Scottish Football League players
Scottish Football League representative players
St Bernard's F.C. players
Place of death missing
Association football forwards
FA Cup Final players